Fierce (marketed in bold red-lettering as "FIERCE") is a men's fragrance by Abercrombie & Fitch. The cologne was first introduced in 2002. Today, Fierce is the signature scent of the Abercrombie & Fitch brand.

Abercrombie & Fitch has sold over US$200 million of Fierce since 2002. A&F predict sales of Fierce to be at US$90 million for fiscal 2009.

Originally packaged in red, the cologne in now encased in a gray box.

Fierce is a Woody Aromatic fragrance for men. Fierce was created by Christophe Laudamiel and Bruno Jovanovic. Top notes are Fir, Lemon, Orange, Cardamom, Petitgrain and Sea Notes; middle notes are Rosemary, Lily-of-the-Valley, Jasmine, Rose and Sage; base notes are Musk, Vetiver, Oakmoss, Brazilian Rosewood and Sandalwood.

Marketing
The marketing grayscale image for the fragrance is a "ripped male torso."

Fierce is the representative scent of A&F. The cologne is sprayed throughout the stores and on clothing as a form of marketing. A&F has spent over US$3 million for scent-spraying machines for its flagship stores.  Increasingly, non-flagship stores are also being equipped with the ceiling installation fragrance distributors.

Abercrombie & Fitch's Christmas 2009 fashion season was themed "FIERCE". In a new marketing move, the seasonal photography bore quotations from prominent historical writers (Arthur Conan Doyle, Don Marquis, Henry Ward Beecher, and Gilbert K. Chesterton) all containing the word "FIERCE" in bold/red.

The fragrance has been marketed on highway billboards as well.

Controversies

Lawsuit against Beyoncé
On September 27, 2009, Abercrombie & Fitch filed a lawsuit against Beyoncé, because Beyoncé was releasing a fragrance and clothing line called "Sasha Fierce". Abercrombie & Fitch took action by filing a lawsuit   accusing her of trademark infringement, unfair competition and deceptive trade practices because A&F already markets a men's cologne called Fierce. The company also cited a potential likelihood of confusion while sending Beyoncé a warning to "cease-and-desist." In response, Coty, Inc., the company Beyoncé hired for her fragrance, stated that the terms "Fierce" and "Sasha Fierce" were never intended to be used for the fragrance. The fragrance was later revealed to be named "Heat".

References 

Perfumes
Abercrombie & Fitch brands
Products introduced in 2002